David Dorfman (born February 7, 1993) is an American attorney and retired actor. He portrayed Aidan Keller in the 2002 horror film remake The Ring, and its 2005 sequel The Ring Two. His other film roles include Sammy in Panic, Joey in Bounce, and Jedidiah Hewitt in The Texas Chainsaw Massacre. He has also portrayed Charles Wallace Murry in the film version of A Wrinkle in Time. In 2008, Dorfman appeared in the film Drillbit Taylor. He was cast alongside Thomas Haden Church in Zombie Roadkill, and appeared as a soldier of the Lannisters in the Game of Thrones seventh season episode "Dragonstone."

In his legal career, Dorfman has already acquired a diverse background, which includes time in Hong Kong as a rising star with a major law firm. , he works at the US House of Representatives, serving as Legislative Director/General Counsel to the Energy & Commerce Committee's Vice Chair and Homeland Security Committee's Cybersecurity Subcommittee Emeritus Chair.

Education
In 2006, Dorfman was admitted to UCLA at age 13. In 2011, he graduated as valedictorian, and was admitted to Harvard Law School at 18.

Filmography

Film

Television

Awards and nominations

References

External links

1993 births
American male child actors
American male film actors
American male television actors
20th-century American Jews
Living people
Male actors from Los Angeles
Harvard Law School alumni
University of California, Los Angeles alumni
21st-century American Jews